Celentano is a surname of Italian origin. People with that name include:

Adriano Celentano (born 1938), Italian singer and actor
Bernardo Celentano (1835 – 1863), Italian painter
Daniel Celentano (1902 – 1980), American artist
David Celentano (born 1951), American epidemiologist
Francis Celentano (1928 – 2016), American painter
Jeff Celentano (born 1960), American actor and director
Mark Celentano (born 1964), American General Contractor - Malibu, California 
Rosalinda Celentano (born 1968), Italian actress
Harry Celentano (born 1975) American licensed Optician and district manager

See also
Mina Celentano, a 1998 album by Mina and Adriano Celentano
Pizza Celentano, a Ukrainian restaurant franchise